Malaysia Swimming Federation is the national governing body of swimming, water polo, synchronised swimming, diving and open water in Malaysia. Founded as the Amateur Swimming Union of Malaysia (ASUM), the body adopted its current name in July 2020. It is charged with selecting Malaysia Olympic Swimming team and any other teams which officially represent Malaysia, as well as the overall organization and operation of the sport within the country. The national headquarters is located at the National Aquatic Centre, National Sports Complex in Bukit Jalil, Kuala Lumpur.

Championships
Amateur Swimming Union of Malaysia organises championships every year in each of the sporting disciplines.

Swimming
Long course

Malaysia Open Swimming Championships (50 m) are usually held in May each year.

See also
 List of Malaysian records in swimming

References

Swimming organizations
Sports governing bodies in Malaysia
Swimming in Malaysia
National members of the Asian Swimming Federation